Police Woman is an American police procedural television series created by Robert L. Collins, starring Angie Dickinson that ran on NBC for four seasons, from September 13, 1974, to March 29, 1978.

As of 2023, it is the oldest live action television series with all of its main actors still living.

Synopsis

Based on an original screenplay by Lincoln C. Hilburn, the series revolves around Sgt. "Pepper" Anderson (Dickinson), an undercover police officer working for the Criminal Conspiracy Unit of the Los Angeles Police Department. Sergeant William "Bill" Crowley (Earl Holliman) was her immediate superior, and Pete Royster (Charles Dierkop) and Joe Styles (Ed Bernard) were the other half of the undercover team that investigated everything from murders to rape and drug crimes. In many episodes, Pepper went undercover (as a prostitute, nurse, teacher, flight attendant, prison inmate, dancer, waitress, etc.) to get close enough to the suspects to gain valuable information that would lead to their arrest.

Character's name
Although Dickinson's character was called Pepper, sources differ as to the legal given name of the character. Most sources give the character's legal name as Suzanne. Others give it as Leanne or Lee Ann (the latter name is mentioned by Crowley in the second-season episode "The Chasers" and by Pepper herself in the first-season episodes "Fish" and "The Stalking of Joey Marr"). The Police Story episode entitled "The Gamble", which serves as a pilot for Police Woman, gives Dickinson's character's name as "Lisa Beaumont", although her character in "The Gamble" is a new officer, whereas on "Police Woman" she is a seasoned detective sergent. On the Season 1 DVD release of Police Woman, Dickinson states that the producers and she decided not to go with the name Lisa Beaumont when the series first went into production, and came up with the name Pepper.

Episodes

Guest stars

Among the guest stars in the series' 91 episodes were: Edie Adams, Loni Anderson, Diane Baker, Frank Bonner, Rossano Brazzi, Melendy Britt, Rory Calhoun, Dane Clark, Bob Crane, Patricia Crowley, James Darren, Ruby Dee, Sandra Dee, Danny DeVito, Elinor Donahue, Patty Duke, Geoff Edwards, Sam Elliott, Ned Glass, Audrey Landers, Rhonda Fleming, Erica Hagen, Kevin Hagen, Larry Hagman, Florence Halop, Mark Harmon, Chick Hearn, Robert Horton, Amy Irving, Bayn Johnson, Cheryl Ladd, Fernando Lamas, Barry Livingston, Ida Lupino, Carol Lynley, Ian McShane, Don Meredith, Donna Mills, Juliet Mills, James Olson, Annette O'Toole, Michael Parks, Lee Paul, E. J. Peaker, Joanna Pettet, Kathleen Quinlan, Kim Richards, Kyle Richards, Cathy Rigby, Smokey Robinson, Ruth Roman, Tom Rosqui, Ricky Segall, William Shatner, Fay Spain, Michelle Stacy, Laraine Stephens, Philip Michael Thomas, Robert Vaughn, John Vernon, Patrick Wayne, Carole Wells, Adam West, Barry Williams, and Debra Winger.

Release

Ratings and timeslots

Home media 
On March 7, 2006, Sony Pictures Home Entertainment released season one of Police Woman on DVD in Region 1. Shout! Factory acquired the rights to the series in Region 1 in October 2011 and planned to release additional seasons on DVD. They subsequently released season two on February 7, 2012. Season three was released on December 19, 2017. Season four was released on May 8, 2018.

Syndication 
The streaming service Tubi has all episodes of the show to watch with commercials starting in January 2022. Several episodes from the first season are available to view for free in Minisode format on Crackle. Decades Television Network is airing episodes on April 3 and 4, 2021, as part of the "Decades Binge".
The series can be seen on MeTV+.

Reception

Police Woman was the first hour-long television drama starring a woman as a police officer. Dickinson received three Emmy nominations and a Golden Globe award on the show. Although the syndicated 1957 series Decoy (starring Beverly Garland) was the first American television show to focus on a female police officer, the 30-minute drama series was shortlived, lasting only a single season.

By the last season Dickinson tired of appearing in scenes "where the phone rings while I'm taking a bath. I always want to look as sexy, beautiful and luscious as I can. But I'd prefer scripts where the sensuality is pouring out naturally for the whole 60 minutes". She nonetheless did not expect the show's cancellation. Dickinson said in 2019 that she regrets having done the series, since the remuneration was inadequate and it left her with little time for other projects.

While the series never ranked above number 15 in the ratings for a given season, Police Woman hit number 1 for the week on two occasions during its first year, also hitting number 1 in several countries in which the program aired.

Police Woman influenced later shows such as Charlie's Angels, which People in 1978 described as a "three-shaker imitation". It caused an avalanche of applications for employment from women to police departments around the United States. Sociologists who have in recent years examined the inspiration for long-term female law enforcement officials to adopt this vocation have been surprised by how often Police Woman has been referenced.

President Gerald Ford rescheduled a press conference so as not to delay an episode of Police Woman, reportedly his favorite show.

"Flowers of Evil" controversy 

"Flowers of Evil" was the eighth episode of season one; it aired on November 8, 1974. In it, Pepper investigates a trio of lesbians who run a retirement home while robbing and murdering the elderly residents. Gay and lesbian groups protested the episode, calling its portrayal of lesbianism stereotypical and negative. A group of lesbian activists zapped NBC's corporate offices a week after the episode aired, occupying the offices overnight. Following negotiations with activists, NBC agreed in 1975 not to rebroadcast the episode. "Flowers of Evil" is available on the season 1 DVD box set.

References

External links

 

1970s American crime drama television series
1970s American police procedural television series
1974 American television series debuts
1978 American television series endings
American television spin-offs
Fictional portrayals of the Los Angeles Police Department
English-language television shows
NBC original programming
Television series by Sony Pictures Television
Television shows set in Los Angeles
Television shows filmed in Los Angeles